Boukaïs is a town and commune in Lahmar District, Béchar Province, in western Algeria. According to the 2008 census its population is 970, up from 890 in 1998, and its annual population growth rate is 0.9%.

Geography

There is an even higher range of lightly colored hills to the west. The Oued Ihrassa passes by the town to the east; water from this river is used to irrigate the palm grove found to the southwest of the town.

Climate

Boukaïs has a hot desert climate, with very hot summers and cool winters, and low precipitation throughout the year, especially in summer.

Economy

Agriculture is a significant industry in Boukaïs. There are a total of 19,000 date palms planted in the commune. As of 2009 there were 1,613 sheep, 1,815 goats, 613 camels, and 8 cattle.

Infrastructure and housing

100% of Boukaïs's population is connected to drinking water, 99% is connected to the sewerage system, and 91% (including 210 buildings) have access to electricity. There is no fuel service stations in the town.

Boukaïs has a total of 239 houses, of which 163 are occupied, giving an occupation rate of 6.0 inhabitants per occupied building.

Transportation

A local road connects the town to Lahmar,  to the east, and then continues south to the provincial capital Béchar,  from Boukaïs.

Education

There is one elementary school, with 8 classrooms including 5 in use. There are a total of 97 elementary and middle school students; secondary school students attend education in Lahmar.

6.0% of the population has a tertiary education, and another 20.6% has competed secondary education. The overall literacy rate is 79.7%, and is 86.7% among males and 73.2% among females.

Health

Boukaïs only has one room care facility; for medical treatment residents must travel to a clinic in Lahmar or the hospital in Béchar.

Religion

Boukaïs has one operational mosque, with another one under construction.

Localities
The commune is composed of just one locality – the town of Boukaïs itself.

References

Neighbouring towns and cities

Communes of Béchar Province